This is a list of songs set in or about New Orleans, Louisiana.

0-9
 "1220 Lyons Street" by Idris Muhammad
 "35th Street Blues" by Jelly Roll Morton
 "912 Greens" by Ramblin' Jack Elliot

A
 "A Little Lovin'" by Neil Sedaka
 "A New Orleans" by Adriano Celentano
 "After The Mardi Gras" by Al Anderson (NRBQ)
 "Ain't No City Like New Orleans" by Earl King
 "Ain't Nothin' Like It (Mad Mad Mardi Gras)" by AJ Loria
 "Alexis" by The James Gang
 "Algiers Bounce" by Bob Wallis Storyville Jazzmen
 "Algiers Stomp" by Mills Blue Rhythm Band
 "Algiers Strut" by Kid Thomas Valentine
 "Alive and Kickin'" by Fats Domino
 "All I Need" by Mat Kearney
 "All On A Mardi Gras Day" by Wild Magnolias
 "Allen Toussaint" by Christopher Marsceill aka Reverend Chris
 "Alone In New Orleans" by Frances Wayne
 "Along The Pontchartrain" by Tony Carey
 "Amos Moses'" by Jerry Reed
 "Annie New Orleans" by Elf
 "Another Murder In New Orleans" by Bobby Rush
 "Apache Rose Peacock" by the Red Hot Chili Peppers
 "Appointment In New Orleans" by Tiziana Ghiglioni
 "Arc of Bar" by Japandroids
 "Astoria Strut" by Jones & Collins Astoria Hot Eight
 "At The Mardi Gras" by Beatrice Lillie
 "At The Mardi Gras" by The Dynamics
 "At The Mardi Gras" by Huey "Piano" Smith & Curley Moore
 "At The Mardi Gras Parade" by Ray Anthony
 "The Avenue" by Cowboy Mouth
 "Axeman's Jazz" by The Rumblestrutters

B
 "BaBu Padee Dupa, A Honky-Tonk Too" by Little Tom Tranker
 "Baby Please (All The Shrimp In New Orleans)" by Keith Sykes
 "Baby, Please Don't Go" performed by Big Joe Williams, Boozoo Chavis, Them
 "Back In Blue Orleans" by Les Hooper 
 "Back in My Home Town" by Champion Jack Dupree
 "Back In New Orleans" by Houston Person
 "Back O' Town Blues" by Louis Armstrong
 "Back On Front Street" by Roomful of Blues
 "Back to New Orleans" by Buddy Knox
 "Back to New Orleans" by Laurel Aitken
 "Back to New Orleans" by Old Crow Medicine Show
 "Ballet New Orleans" by Jean-Jacques Debout & Pierre Porte
 "Bamboo Road" by Willy DeVille
 "Barrelhouse Bessie From Basin Street" by Bob Crosby and his Orchestra
 "Basin Street" by Clarence "Frogman" Henry
 "Basin Street Ball" by Harry Roy
 "Basin Street Beat" by Jimmy McPartland
 "Basin Street Blues" by Spencer Williams
 "Basin Street Boogie" by Pete Daily's Chicagoans
 "Basin Street Brass" by Rahmlee
 "Basin Street East" by Pete Rugolo and his Orchestra
 "Basin Street Lover" by J. C. Johnson
 "Basin Street Rumble" by The Jordan Brothers
 "Basin Street Stomp" by Basin Street Six
 "Baton Rouge" by The Nixons
 "Battle At New Orleans" by Jim Weaver & Levy Singers
 "The Battle of New Orleans" by Jimmy Driftwood, made popular by Johnny Horton, 1959
 "The Battle of New Orleans" by Zachary Richard
 "Bayou Lena" by Widespread Panic
 "The Bayou Savings Bank Of New Orleans" by Tony Lee Sybert
 "Bayou St John" by Paul Weston
 "Bayou Teche" by Doug Kershaw
 "Below the Water Line" by Paul Soniat
 "The Big Bass Drum (On A Mardi Gras Day)" by Dr John
 "Big Box Dinny" by The Elders
 "Big Chief" by Earl King
 "Big Easy" by Skull Duggery
 "The Big Easy" by Walter "Wolfman" Washington
 "Big Fat Mama From New Orleans" by Tommy Mosley 
 "Big John" by Jimmy Dean
 "The Big Muddy" by Bruce Springsteen
 "Big River" by Johnny Cash
 "Black Water" by The Doobie Brothers
 "Blame It On New Orleans by Mac McAnally
 "Blind Willie McTell" by Bob Dylan
 "Blood Swamp" by Dash Rip Rock
 "Bloodletting" by Concrete Blonde
 "Blue Orleans" by Billie Jo Spears
 "Blue Orleans" by Les Hooper
 "Blues For New Orleans" by Voice Of The Wetlands All-Stars (featuring Cyril Neville)
 "Blues In New Orleans" by Jack Ross
 "Blues Of New Orleans" by Jessie Martin
 "Bob Dylan's New Orleans Rag" by Bob Dylan
 "Boogaloo Mardi Gras" by Bobby Williams Group
 "Boogie Down To New Orleans" by Che & Ray 
 "Boogie Woogie Preacher From New Orleans" by Danny Taylor
 "Border of the Quarter" by Leon Redbone
 "Born in Louisiana" by Clarence "Gatemouth" Brown
 "Born in New Orleans" by Paul Soniat
 "Born on the Bayou" by Creedence Clearwater Revival
 "Bourbon Street" by Eddie Schwartz
 "Bourbon Street" by Hurriganes 
 "Bourbon Street" by Little River Band
 "Bourbon Street Beat" by Don Ralke
 "Bourbon Street Blues" from Mardi Gras
 "Bourbon Street Cajun" by Jim Olivier  
 "Bourbon Street Jump" by Raymond Hill
 "Bourbon Street Parade" by Al Terry
 "Bourbon Street Parade" by Paul Barbarin
 "Bourbon Street Shuffle" by Big Ben Banjo Band
 "Bourbon Street Skank" by Ernest Ranglin
 "Bourbon Street Stroll" by Einstein
 "Bowie Knife" by Frankie Laine
 "Boy from New Orleans" by Louis Armstrong
 "Breakdancer's Reunion" by Self
 "Breathe In, Breathe Out, Move On" by Jimmy Buffett
 "Bring Back Storyville" by Guy Davis
 "Broadway At Basin Street" by Cannonball Adderley
 "Brown Sugar" by The Rolling Stones
 "Buddy Bolden's Blues" by Jelly Roll Morton
 "Burgundy Street" by Acker Bilk  
 "Burgundy Street Blues" by George Lewis
 "By the River" by Dirty Deep
 "By Route Of New Orleans" by Ed Bruce

C
 "Callin Baton Rouge" by Garth Brooks
 “Calling the Children Home” by Little Feat
 "Cajun Man Gets the Blues" by Tab Benoit
 "Cajun Stripper" by Doug Kershaw
 "Canal Street Blues" by King Oliver
 "Canal Street Parade" by Drifting Cowboys
 "Candyman" by Reverend Gary Davis
 "Canal Street Polka" by Rodgers Brothers Band
 "Cannibal Mardi Gras" by Lorrae Desmond
 "Carnival In New Orleans" by Professor Longhair
 "Carnival Time" by Al "Carnival Time" Johnson
 "Chickee Le Pas" by Dr. John
 "Chloe Dancer" by Mother Love Bone
 "Chop and Change" by The Black Keys
 "Christmas in New Orleans" by Dick Sherman and Joe Van Winkle, popularised by Louis Armstrong
 "Christmas Night 4 A.M. New Orleans" by Flat Duo Jets
 "Chromatic Lee Suite" by Lee Konitz
 "City Beneath the Sea" by Harry Connick Jr.
 "City That Care Forgot" by Dr. John
 "Clean Up (After Mardi Gras)" by Charmaine Neville
 "Clementine (From New Orleans)" by Bix Beiderbecke
 "The Comancheros" by Lonnie Donegan
 "Come On Back To New Orleans" by Willie West
 "Come On Down To New Orleans" by Shamarr Allen
 "Come To Mardi Gras" by Ironing Board Sam
 "Come To The Mardi Gras" by Allen Toussaint
 "Come To The Mardi Gras" by Edmundo Ros
 "Congo" by Amel Larrieux
 "Congo Square" by Chuck Perkins
 "Congo Square" by Wynton Marsalis, Johnny Wiggs, Great White
 "Congo Square Rag" by Corey Harris
 "Conja (New Orleans 1786)" by Beausoleil
 "Count Of Clerkenwell" by Arthur Kay's Originals
 "Country Boy Down in New Orleans" by Doug Kershaw
 "Crackstatic" by Ron Hawkins and the Rusty Nails
 "Crazy Mixed-Up Bourbon Street" by New Orleans Rag Peddlers
 "Crescent Blues (Ad Lib Blues)" by Paul Barbarin 
 "Crescent City" by Giorgio Gaslini Quartet
 "Crescent City" by Lucinda Williams
 "Crescent City" by Paul Weston
 "Crescent City" by Zydeco Party Band
 "Crescent City Blues" by Little Brother Montgomery
 "Crescent City Bounce" by Archibald & His Orchestra
 "Crescent City Cry" by New Pulse Jazz Band
 "Crescent City Moon" by Voice Of The Wetlands All-Stars (featuring Cyril Neville)
 "Crescent City Starlights" by Walter "Wolfman" Washington
 "Crescent City Stomp" by Stan Kenton Alumni Band 
 "Crescent City, U.S.A." by Tommy Tate

D
 "A Dallas Cowboy and a New Orleans Saint" by The Kendalls
 "Dance Back From the Grave" by Marc Cohn
 "Dance To The Mardi Gras" by Murray Campo and the Jazz Saints
 "(Dance with Me) Tonight at the Mardi Gras" by Irving Berlin 
 "Dark Lady" by Cher
 "Dauphin Street Blues" (traditional jazz tune)
 "Decatur Drive" by Chris Barber
 "Decatur Street Blues" by Piano Red
 "Decatur Street Boogie" by Piano Red
 "Decatur Street Tutti" by Jabbo Smith
 "Deep Bayou Blues" by George Lewis 
 "Destination New Orleans" by Jimmy Lindsey
 "Devil Take New Orleans" by Bill Wrinn
 "Dirt" by Dash Rip Rock
 "Dirty Martini" by Joe Jackson
 "Dixie Flyer" by Randy Newman
 "Dixieland Rock" by Elvis Presley
 "Do The Fat Tuesday" by Kermit Ruffins
 "Do Watcha Wanna" by Rebirth Brass Band
 "Do You Know What It Means to Miss New Orleans?" by Hoagy Carmichael, Louis Armstrong, Harry Connick Jr. and many others
 "Don't it Just Break Your Heart" by Big Rude Jake
 "(Down at) Papa Joe's" by The Dixie Belles
 "Down at the Twist and Shout" by Mary Chapin Carpenter
 "Down Bourbon Street" by Jimmy McPartland
 "Down in Dear Old New Orleans" by Con Conrad
 "Down in New Orleans by Dr. John from Disney's The Princess and the Frog, 2009
 "Down in New Orleans" by Fabulous Little Joe
 "Down in New Orleans" by George "Harmonica" Smith 
 "Down in New Orleans" by Steppenwolf
 "Down in New Orleans" by The Vibrations
 "Down in Old New Orleans" by Mickey Jupp
 "Down In Storyville" by Rahmlee
 "Down in the Quarter" by Paul Soniat
 "Down On Second Street" by Zachary Richard
 "Down on the Border" by Little River Band
 "Down South in New Orleans" by Doug Kershaw, The Band
 "Down The Dustpipe" by Status Quo (band)
 "Down to New Orleans" by Vince Gill
 "Drop Me Off In New Orleans" by Kermit Ruffins
 "Dumaine Street Blues" by Glen David Andrews
Dreamers Ball Live Queen

E
"Esplanade At Sunset" by Paul Weston
"Every Dog Has Its Day" by Willy DeVille
"Every Mother's Son" by Humble Pie
"Everybody's Rockin" by Neil Young
"Exhibit A" by Jay Electronica
"Ex's and Oh's" by Elle King

F
 "Fancy" by Bobbie Gentry; Reba McEntire
 "Farewell to Storyville" by Billie Holiday and Louis Armstrong
 "Fat Tuesday" by Allen Toussaint
 "Fat Tuesday" by Grant-Lyttelton Paseo Jazz Band (featuring Humphrey Lyttelton)
 "Feels Like Rain" by John Hiatt
 "Ferryboat To Algiers" by Paul Weston
 "Fishwater" by Widespread Panic
 "Frankie and Johnny" version by Champion Jack Dupree
 "Franklin Street Blues" by Bunk Johnson
 "French Quarter" by Delta Spirit
 "French Quarter" by Madcap
 "French Quarter Faggot" by Quintron
 "French Quarter Strut" by James Taylor's 4th Dimension (featuring James Taylor of the James Taylor Quartet)
 "Frenchmen Street Stomp" by Christopher Marsceill aka Reverend Chris
 "From Baton Rouge To New Orleans" by Beelow

G
 "Gal From New Orleans" by Knightsbridge Orchestra
 "The Ghost Of Highway 61" by Mighty Mo Rodgers
 "Girl Down In New Orleans" by Floyd Dixon
 "Girl in New Orleans" by Sammi Smith
 "Give 'Em Hell Kid" by My Chemical Romance
 "Go Back to your Woods" by Robbie Robertson
 "Go Down To New Orleans" by Lillian Boutté
 "Go To New Orleans" by New Orleans Red Beans (featuring Paul Barbarin)
 "Go to the Mardi Gras" by Professor Longhair
 "God-Forsaken Town" by Reckless Kelly
 "Goin' Back to Louisiana" by Delbert McClinton
 "Goin' Down To New Orleans" by Bluebird 
 "Goin' Home" by Ken Colyer 
 "Goin' to Louisiana" by John Lee Hooker
 "Goin' To Nawlins" by Zydeco Party Band
 "Goin' To New Orleans" by Eddie "Guitar" Burns with Jimmy Burns 
 "Goin' To New Orleans" by Buddy Skipper And The Code Blues Band
 "Going Back to New Orleans" by Artie Malvin
 "Going Back to New Orleans" by Hugh Masekela
 "Going Back to New Orleans" performed by Joe Liggins and the Honeydrippers, Deacon John Moore
 "Going Back To New Orleans" by Leon Haywood
 "Going Back To New Orleans" by Mason Jennings
 "Going To New Orleans" by Charlie Smith Blues Band
 "Gold Guitar" by Bill Anderson
 "Gold In New Orleans" by Left Side 
 "(Gon' Be Dat) New Orleans Music" by Batiste Brothers (featuring Russell Batiste Jr.)  
 "Good Morning New Orleans" by Kermit Ruffins
 "Goodbye Bourbon Street" by The Bishops 
 "Goodbye New Orleans" by Pee Wee King & Redd Stewart
 "Goodbye NOLA" by Winston Hall and Donna Chance
 "Gradle" by Widespread Panic
 "Gris-gris" by Andrew Bird
 "Gravier Street Blues" by Johnny Dodds & Jimmie Noone

H
 "Hate to Feel" by Alice in Chains
 "Havan (By Way Of New Orleans & Hackney)" by MFOS (aka Snowboy)
 "Heart of New Orleans" by John Hemmings
 "Heart of the Night" by Poco
 "Hello My Lover" by Willy DeVille
 "Hello New Orleans" by Robert Earl Keen
 "Help Is on the Way" by Rise Against, 2011 ("The Crescent City sleeps...")
 "Her First Mistake" by Lyle Lovett
 "Hey, Mardi Gras! (Here I Am)" by Chuck Carbo
 "Highway 61" by Tommy McClennan
 "Home" by Marc Broussard, 2005
 "Home In New Orleans" by Pamela Miller
 "Home To New Orleans" by Queen Ida & the Bon Temps Zydeco Band
 "Honky Cat" by Elton John
 "A House In New Orleans" by Ed Bruce
 "The House of the Rising Sun," American folk song, made popular by The Animals, 1964, (#1 on Billboard Hot 100)
 "Houston" by Mary Chapin Carpenter
 "Hurricane" by Levon Helm

I
 "I Am A New Orleans' Genevieve" by Samsun
 "I Didn't Find A Saint (In New Orleans)" by Country Bill White & Dawn Glass
 "I Got A Treme Woman" by Kermit Ruffins
 "I Hope You're Comin' Back to New Orleans" by New Orleans Jazz Vipers
 "I Just Can't Get (New Orleans Off My Mind)" by Fats Domino
 "I Know What It Means To Miss New Orleans" by Vince Vance and the Valiants
 "I Know You Mardi Gras" by Wild Magnolias
 "I Love Louisiana" by Rosie Ledet
 "I Love New Orleans" by Ronnie Milsap
 "I Love To Wake Up In New Orleans" by Larry John McNally
 "I Love You Goodbye" by Thomas Dolby
 "I Might Be Awhile In New Orleans" by Johnny Russell
 "I Thought I Heard New Orleans Say" by Dr. John
 "I Wanna Be the Big Chief" by Christopher Marsceill aka Reverend Chris
 "I Wanna Die in New Orleans" by DiNOLA
 "I Went To The Mardi Gras" by Snooks Eaglin
 "I Wish I Was in New Orleans" by Tom Waits
 "I'd Rather Be In New Orleans" by The Flying Neutrinos
 "If I Were Brave" by Shawn Colvin
 "If New Orleans Is Beat" by The Tragically Hip
 "Iko Iko" by The Dixie Cups, 1965
 "I'm Cousin Joe From New Orleans" by Cousin Joe
 "I'm Going Back To Louisiana" Bruce Channel
 "I'm Going To New Orleans" by Charles Mann
 "I'm Saving Up The Means To Get To New Orleans" by Al Jolson
 "I'm So New Orleans" by Kermit Ruffins
 "In The Clear" by Foo Fighters
 "In Color" by Jamey Johnson
 "In Good Old New Orleans" by Murphy Campo And The Jazz Saints
 "In New Orleans" by Lead Belly
 "In The Old French Quarter Of New Orleans by Maxine Daniels
 "Indian Red", traditional, first recorded by Danny Barker
 "The Irish Went Down To New Orleans" by Charlie Spaniels Band
 "It's A New Orleans Thing" by Allen Toussaint
 "It's Christmas In Nu Awlins" by Gary U.S. Bonds 
 "It's Mardi Gras" by Desire
 "I've Got the Blues for Rampart Street" (jazz tune)

J
 "Jackson Square" by Mason Jennings
 "Jambalaya" by Hank Williams
 "Jambalaya" by Van Morrison & Linda Gail Lew
 "Jammin' To New Orleans" by Risky Business
 "Jazz At Lu Charlie's" by Giorgio Gaslini Quartet
 "Jazz Music" by Gang Starr (this is a different song than the more famous "Jazz Thing")
 "Jazz Thing" by Gang Starr
 "Jazzfest" by Paul Soniat
 "Je T'Aime N'Orleans" by Big Boy Pete (aka as Peter Miller (musician))	
 "Jesus in New Orleans" by Over the Rhine
 "Jock-a-mo" by Sugar Boy Crawford
 "John Lennon In New Orleans" by Colin Linden 
 "Johnny B. Goode" by Chuck Berry
 "Jolie Blon" by Zachary Richard
 "Jump City" by Willy DeVille
 "Just Off Decatur Street" by Willy DeVille
 "Just Outside New Orleans" by Earl Stanley & The Stereos

K
 "Key to My Heart" by Willy DeVille
 "King Creole" by Elvis Presley from the film, 1958
 "King of New Orleans" by Better Than Ezra from Friction, Baby, 1996 (#5 on Modern Rock Tracks Chart)
 "King of the Zulus" by Louis Armstrong
 "King Zulu Parade" by Johnny Wiggs
 "Kingfish" by Randy Newman
 "Knives of New Orleans" by Eric Church, 2015
 "King of the Mardi Gras" by Charmaine Neville

L
 "La Chanson De Les Mardi Gras: by Dewey Balfa & The Balfa Brothers
 "La Chanson De Mardi Gras" by Anúna
 "La Chanson De Mardi Gras" by BeauSoleil  
 "La Chanson Des Mardi Gras" by Zachary Richard
 "La Danse De Mardi Gras" (traditional Cajun tune)
 "La Harpe Street Blues" by Climax Jazz Band
 "La La" by Lil Wayne from Tha Carter III, 2008
 "Lady Marmalade" by Labelle, 1974
 "Lakes Of Pontchartrain"
 "Lakeshore Drive At Milneburg" by Doc Evans With Armand Hug Trio
 "Land Grab" by Dr. John
 "Land Long Gone" by Paul Soniat
 "Last Train To New Orleans" by the Sugar Lumps
 "The Last Waltz" by Bobby Charles
 "Leaving New Orleans" by Jordan Davis (singer)
 "The Legend of the Last of the Outlaw Truckers" by The Dandy Warhols
 "Les Mardi Gras (Riders In The Sky)" by Stan Jones (songwriter)
 "Les Rois de Bourbon Street" by Patrick Norman (singer)
 "Let's Impeach the President" by Neil Young
 "Let's Take A Ferryboat To New Orleans" by Louis Cottrell And His New Orleans Jazz Band
 "Letter From New Orleans" by Raymond Froggatt
 "The Levees Broke (Katrina)" by Jay Electronica
 "Like a Real Cajun" by Michael Doucet
 "Limbo" by Bryan Ferry
 "Little Jewel Of The Vieux Carre" by Joe Barry (singer)
 "Lonely Girl on Bourbon Street" by Mazarati
 "Lonely Mardi Gras" by Michael Hurtt And His Haunted Hearts 
 "Lonesome, On'ry and Mean" written by Steve Young, performed by Waylon Jennings
 "Long Live New Orleans" by Reuben Wilson, Bernard Purdie, Grant Green Jr.
 "Long Way Back From Hell" by Danzig
 "Look For Me In New Orleans" by Tommy McCoy
 "Look Where We Have Been" by Christopher Marsceill aka Reverend Chris
 "Louisiana 1927" written by Randy Newman, performed by Aaron Neville and Marcia Ball
 "Louisiana Blue" by Radney Foster
 "Louisiana Bound" by Big Joe Williams
 "Louisiana Love Call" by Maria Muldaur
 "Louisiana Love Shack" by Pat Boyack
 "Louisiana Lover Man" by Lonesome Sundown
 "Louisiana Man" by Doug Kershaw, Tab Benoit
 "Louisiana Rain" by Anders Osborne
 "Louisiana Santa" by Wayne Toups
 "Louisiana Style" by Tab Benoit
 "Louisiana Suite" by Tom Talbert Orchestra
 "Louisiana Sunday Afternoon" by Diane Schuur
 "Louisiana Sunshine" by Cyril Neville and Tab Benoit
 "Louisiana Woman" by Bryan Lee
 "Louisiana Zydeco" by Clarence "Gatemouth" Brown
 "Love in the Hot Afternoon" by Gene Watson
 "Love in New Orleans" by Los Rabanes
 "Love New Orleans" by Idris Muhammad
 "Loves Of New Orleans", from Naughty Marietta
 "Loving You Has Made Me Bananas" by Guy Marks
 "Lucky" by Seven Mary Three

M
 "Magnolia Soul" by Ozomatli
 "Magnolia Street Parade" by Bob Crosby
 "Mahogany Hall Stomp" by Louis Armstrong
 "Man From New Orleans" by Swampwater
 "Maple Leaf Strutt" by Joe Krown, Walter "Wolfman" Washington, Russell Batiste Jr.
 "Mardi Gras" by Dave "Baby" Cortez
 "Mardi Gras" by David Whitfield
 "Mardi Gras" by Doug Kershaw
 "Mardi Gras" by Flambeaux
 "Mardi Gras" by Gino Vannelli
 "Mardi Gras" by Hugh Martin
 "Mardi Gras" by Ike Quebec
 "Mardi Gras" by Jeff Kashiwa
 "Mardi Gras" by Jessie Hill
 "Mardi Gras" by John Klemmer
 "Mardi Gras", from Mardi Gras (1958 film)
 "Mardi Gras" by Pat Martino
 "Mardi Gras" by Scream
 "Mardi Gras" by Spyro Gyra
 "The Mardi Gras" by Victor Herbert
 "Mardi Gras" by Victor Silvester
 "Mardi Gras And Rosetta Roses" by Casablanca
 "Mardi Gras At Midnight" by A Tribe Called Quest
 "Mardi Gras Beads" by Parquet Courts
 "Mardi Gras (Breeze From The River)" by Howard Blaikley 
 "Mardi Gras Carnival" by Margie Perez
 "Mardi Gras Cha" by Rico Henderson and his Orchestra 
 "Mardi Gras Day" by Manfred Mann's Earth Band
 "Mardi Gras, Down In New Orleans It's Carnival (Mardi Gras Rap)" by The Jones & Taylor Experience
 "Mardi Gras Gumbo" by Kenny 'Blue' Ray
 "Mardi Gras in New Orleans" by Earl King
 "Mardi Gras in New Orleans" by Professor Longhair
 "Mardi Gras In The City" by Earl King
 "Mardi Gras (Indian Dance)" by Paul Weston
 "Mardi Gras Jig" by Dewey Balfa, Tony Balfa, Tracy Schwarz, Peter Schwarz (Tracy Schwarz of Ginny Hawker and Tracy Schwarz)
 "Mardi Gras Madness" by Barney Bigard
 "Mardi Gras Mambo" by The Hawketts
 "Mardi Gras Mambo" by The Meters
 "The Mardi Gras March" by Louis Armstrong
 "Mardi Gras Parade" by Jerry Colonna
 "Mardi Gras Parade" by New Orleans Creole Jazz Band featuring Thomas Jefferson (musician)
 "Mardi Gras Party" by Carl Marshall
 "Mardi Gras Rag" by Wilbur De Paris 
 "Mardi Gras Rock" by Bobby Freeman
 "Mardi Gras Second Line" by Rockin' Sidney 
 "Mardi Gras Song" by John Delafose
 "Mardi Gras Strut" by Al Johnson
 "Mardi Gras Time" by Bayou Renegades
 "Mardi Gras Time" by Timmy Dusenbery
 "Mardi Gras Twist" by Doris Matte
 "The Mardi Gras Walking Club" by Pete Fountain
 "Mardi Gras Waltz" by Carmen Lombardo and John Jacob Loeb
 "Mardi Gras Waltz" by Joe Ely
 "Mardi Gras Zydeco" by Rockin' Sidney 
 "Marie Laveau" by Bobby Bare
 "Matinee Hour In New Orleans" by Three Clouds
 "Me and Bobby McGee" by Janis Joplin
 "Meet the Boys (on the Battlefront)" by The Wild Tchoupitoulas
 "Meet Me On Frenchmen Street" by Shamarr Allen
 "Meet Me On The Levee" by Chris Barber
 "The Mess Inside" by The Mountain Goats
 "A Message To Martha" Adam Faith
 "Message To Michael" by Dionne Warwick
 "Mid-City Baby" by The New Orleans Bingo! Show
 "Midnight In New Orleans" by Earl Hines
 "Milenberg Joys" by Jelly Roll Morton
 "Mississippi Pearl" by The Stray Birds
 "Monday Night In New Orleans" by Kermit Ruffins
 "Moon over Bourbon Street" by Sting
 "Move It" by Cliff Richard with Brian May & Brian Bennett
 "Move to Louisiana" by John Mooney
 "Mr. Bojangles" by Jerry Jeff Walker, made popular by The Nitty Gritty Dirt Band
 "Mr. Mardi Gras" by Allen Toussaint
 "Mr. Tambourine Man" by Bob Dylan
 "Mrs. Orleans" by Trombone Shorty ft. Kid Rock, from For True, 2011
 "Muk Tuk Mardi Gras Two Step" by Frankie Rodgers & the Rodgers Brothers
 "Murder In New Orleans" by Voice Of The Wetlands All-Stars (featuring Cyril Neville)
 "My Blue Ridge Mountain Boy" by Dolly Parton
 "My Darlin' New Orleans" by L'il Queenie
 "My Father's Gun" by Elton John
 "My Hometown New Orleans" by Paul Soniat
 "My Little Old Home Down In New Orleans" by Frank Luther 
 "My New Orleans" by Al Fats Edwards
 "My NOLA" by Harry Connick, Jr.
 "My People Need A Second Line" by Dr. John
 "My Sanctuary" by Marc Cohn

N

 "N.O. Blues" by Stan Tracey
 "N.O.L.A. My Home" by Willie West
 "N.O. Stylee" by Skull Duggery
 "N.O.T. Aka N’Awlins Thang" by Raphael Wressnig's Organic Trio
 "N'Awlin Nights" by Kim Mitchell
 "N'awlins" by The Zawinul Syndicate
 "N'awlins" by Bobby Stagg
 "The New Battle of New Orleans" by Ray Stevens
 "New Highway 51" by Tommy McClennan
 "New Mardi Gras Dance" by Aldus Roger and the Lafayette Playboys	
 "New Orleans" by Al Prince
 "New Orleans" by Beautiful Creatures 
 "New Orleans" by Bill Pritchard
 "NEW ORLEANS" by Brockhampton (band)
 "New Orleans" by Cash McCall
 "New Orleans" by Cowboy Mouth
 "New Orleans" by Curtis Mayfield
 "New Orleans" by David Hess
 "New Orleans" by Elvis Presley
 "New Orleans" by Emerson, Lake & Palmer
 "New Orleans" by The Essex Green
 "New Orleans" by Gary U.S. Bonds, The Grateful Dead, The Radiators, The Blues Brothers, The Stampeders, Joan Jett and the Blackhearts, Neil Diamond, Hank Williams Jr., and others
 "New Orleans" by Henry Creamer and Turner Layton 
 "New Orleans" by Hoagy Carmichael
 "New Orleans" by Howard Blaikley
 "New Orleans" by Husky
 "New Orleans" by Idris Muhammad
 "New Orleans" (from Is Everybody Happy? (1929 film))
 "New Orleans" by John Stewart
 "New Orleans" by Kid Rock
 "New Orleans" by King Curtis
 "New Orleans" by Les Humphries
 "New Orleans" by Mamie Smith
 "New Orleans" by The New Orleans Bingo! Show
 "New Orleans" by Nicky Henson & Dana Gillespie	
 "New Orleans" by Parachute
 "New Orleans" by Paris
 "New Orleans" by The Pazant Brothers and the Beaufort Express	
 "New Orleans" by Peshay
 "New Orleans" by Rancid
 "New Orleans" by Sarah McCoy
 "New Orleans" by St Joe Run
 "New Orleans" by Silver Jews
 "New Orleans" by Stevie Nicks
 "New Orleans" by Toby Keith
 "New Orleans" by Trampled by Turtles
 "New Orleans" by Truckers
 "New Orleans" by Your Heart Breaks
 "New Orleans 2am" by The Khans
 "New Orleans And A Rusty Old Horn" by Sonny Knight
 "New Orleans Ain't The Same" by Fats Domino
 "New Orleans Beat" by The Cannonballs
 "New Orleans Beat" by Jimmy McCracklin
 "New Orleans Beat" by Steve Riley
 "New Orleans Biguine" by Pierre Dalmon
 "New Orleans Blue" by Jerry Foster
 "New Orleans Blues" by Blue Lu Barker
 "New Orleans Blues" by Jelly Roll Morton
 "New Orleans Blues" by Johnny De Droit and the New Orleans Jazz Orchestra
 "New Orleans Blues" by Willie Mabon
 "New Orleans Bump" by Jelly Roll Morton and later by Wynton Marsalis
 "New Orleans Calling" by Newark Boys Chorus, Rutgers Jazz Ensemble
 "New Orleans Cannon Ball" by George Garabedian Players
 "New Orleans Cha-Cha" by Jerry Colonna
 "The New Orleans Connection" by Michael "Bami" Rose
 "New Orleans Cookin'" by Cyril Neville
 "New Orleans Drag" by Sammy Price and his Rompin' Stompers
 "New Orleans Forever" from Jérôme Savary's 'Looking for Josephine' 
 "New Orleans Function" by Louis Armstrong
 "New Orleans Funeral" by Hazy Osterwald
 "New Orleans Girl" by Winston Hall and Donna Chance
 "New Orleans Gumbo" by Idris Muhammad
 "New Orleans (The Home Of The Bluzz)" by Eddie Zip And Fast Company
 "New Orleans Hop" by Monte Easter
 "New Orleans Hop Scop Blues" by Richard M. Jones 
 "New Orleans Hula" by George Lewis
 "New Orleans In The Rain" by Johnny Williams
 "New Orleans Is a Dying Whore" by Down
 "New Orleans Is A Mighty Good Town" by Eddy Raven
 "New Orleans Is Coming Back" David Batiste & The Gladiators
 "New Orleans Is My Home" by The Jingle Janglers
 "New Orleans Is Sinking" by The Tragically Hip
 "New Orleans is the New Vietnam" by Eyehategod
 "New Orleans Jail" by Rod Bernard
 "New Orleans Jeunesse Dorèe" from Naughty Marietta
 "New Orleans Joys" by Lu Watters and the Yerba Buena Jazz Band
 "New Orleans Ladies" by Le Roux
 "New Orleans Lady" by James Rivers
 "New Orleans, Louisiana" by Dr. John and Chris Barber
 "New Orleans Low Down" by Duke Ellington
 "New Orleans Mambo" by James Rivers Quartet
 "New Orleans (Mardi Gras)" by Southwind
 "New Orleans Moan" by Roselyn Lionhart (of duo David and Roselyn)
 "New Orleans Music" by Rebirth Brass Band
 "New Orleans Music" by Tony Wilson (a member of Hot Chocolate)
 "New Orleans (My Home Town)" by Kermit Ruffins
 "New Orleans, New Orleans" by Bintangs
 "New Orleans Parade" by Chris Barber
 "New Orleans Poon" (from Prettybelle)
 "New Orleans Post Parade" by Scatman Crothers
 "New Orleans Presidential Shit" by Lil Wayne
 "New Orleans Rag" by Willie 'The Rock' Knox 
 "New Orleans, RIP" by Meriwether
 "New Orleans Rock" by The 5.6.7.8's
 "New Orleans Second Line" by Olympia Brass Band
 "New Orleans Shuffle" by Johnny Otis
 "New Orleans Song" by La Croix
 "New Orleans Stomp" by Louis Armstrong
 "New Orleans Street March" by Chris Farlowe, Brian Auger and Pete York
 "New Orleans Strut" by Cannonball Adderley
 "A New Orleans Suite" by Sheba Sound
 "New Orleans Twist" by Blazer Boy
 "New Orleans When It Rains" by Razzy Bailey
 "New Orleans Wiggle" by Piron's New Orleans Orchestra
 "New Orleans Wins the War" by Randy Newman
 "New Orleans Woman" by Dirty Blues Band (a band formed by Rod Piazza)
 "New Orleans Woman" by Dorsey Burnette
 "New Orleans Woman" by Elmer Tippe
 "New York To New Orleans" by Pee Wee King & His Golden West Cowboys
 "Night Train to New Orleans" by Wayne Toups
 "Ninth Ward Blues" by King James & The Special Men
 "Ninth Ward Swing" by William Clarke And The NightOwls 
 "No City Like New Orleans" by Earl King
 "Nola" by Dayna Kurtz
 "Norleans" by Lonnie Smith
 "North Rampart Street March (On Parade)" by Sharkey Bonano

O
 "Oh Louisiana" by Wayne Toups
 "Oh New Orleans" by Peter Parker's Rock 'n' Roll Club
 "Oh My NOLA" by Harry Connick Jr.
 "Old Bridge" by Dash Rip Rock
 "Old New Orleans Rhythm And Blues" by Mike Young & Ricky Kelly
 "One Block Back Of Basin Street" by Dolph Hewitt
 "One More Murder" by Better Than Ezra from How Does Your Garden Grow?, 1998
 "One Night In New Orleans" by Blackhawk
 "Orleans" by The Standstills
 "Orleans Parish Prison" by Dick Feller
 "Orleans Party" by Ironing Board Sam

P
 "Papa De-Da-Da (A New Orleans Stomp)" by Clarence Williams
 "Pearl of the Quarter" by Steely Dan
 "Peel" by Seven Mary Three
 "Perdido" by Duke Ellington
 "Perdido Street" by Herbert Hardesty and the Rhythm Rollers	
 "Perdido Street Blues" by Louis Armstrong
 "Perdido Street Stomp" by Sidney Bechet
 "Planet of New Orleans" by Dire Straits
 "Pontchartrain Blues" by Jelly Roll Morton
 "Promised Land" by Chuck Berry
 "Proud Mary" by Creedence Clearwater Revival
 "Prytania" by Mutemath 2011, from Odd Soul

Q
 "Quarter Rat" by Christopher Marsceill aka Reverend Chris
 "Queen of New Orleans" by Earl Thomas Conley
 "Queen of New Orleans" by Jon Bon Jovi
 "Queen of the Mardi Gras" by Marty Wyte
 "Queen of the Mardi Gras" by Tony Christie

R
 "Rainin' In New Orleans" by Lonesome Romeos
 "Rainin' Pain Down in New Orleans" by Warren Haynes
 "Ramblin', Gamblin' Willie" by Bob Dylan
 "Ramblin Man" by Allman Brothers
 "Rampart Street Blues" by Cotton Pickers
 "Red Beans" by Henry Roeland Byrd aka Professor Longhair
 "Red Boy At The Mardi Gras" by Todd Rhodes Orchestra
 "Red Eye" by Paul Soniat
 "Red Rain" by Paris
 "Relaxin' at the Touro" by Muggsy Spanier
 "Remember Me To New Orleans" by Alice Creech
 "Rendesvous In Congo Square" by Jackie McLean
 "Reuben and Cherise" by Jerry Garcia Band
 "Rich Bitch from the Garden District" by Paul Soniat
 "Right Around The Corner From Basin Street" by Maxwell Davis Orchestra
 "The River in Reverse" by Elvis Costello & Allen Toussaint
 "Riverboat Fantasy" by David Wilcox 
 "Rock Island Line" by Johnny Cash
 "Roll On Tulane (The Olive And Blue)" by Johnny Long (musician) and his Orchestra 
 "Roseland Waltz" by Willis Prudhomme & Zydeco Express
 "Royal Orleans" by Led Zeppelin
 "Royal Street" by Jim Helms, Gary LeMel, Norma Green 
 "Royal Street" by Paul Reynoso
 "Royal Street" by Thomas Talbert Jazz Orchestra
 "Royal Street Flush" by Band Of Pleasure (features James Gadson)
 "Rubin and Cherise" by Jerry Garcia
 "Rudee Down In New Orleans" by Blaze Foley
 "Rumpus on Rampart Street" by Edmond Hall
 "Running To New Orleans" by Byther Smith

S
 "Sadie Green Vamp Of New Orleans" by Five Harmonicas
 "Sailing to New Orleans" by Victor Johnson
 "St. James Infirmary Blues" recorded by numerous musicians
 "Saint Of New Orleans" by PJ Parks
 "St. Patricks Day In New Orleans" by Alias Ron Kavana
 "St. Phillips St. Breakdown" by George Lewis 
 "The Saints are Coming" by U2 and Green Day, 2006 (#2 on UK Singles Chart)
 "Saturday Night Fish Fry" by Louis Jordan
 "Save my Soul" by Big Bad Voodoo Daddy
 "Say, Has Anybody Seen My Sweet Gypsy Rose" by Tony Orlando and Dawn
 "Say Whut?" by Dr. John
 "See You All in Hell or New Orleans" by Dax Riggs
 "Serpentflame" by Calabrese
 "Shake That Monkey" by Too Short
 "Shake Your Tambourine" by The Neville Brothers
 "She Darked the Sun" by Dillard & Clark
 "She Took Me To The Mardi Gras" by Tony Christie
 "She's My Man" by Scissor Sisters
 "Shreveport Stomp" by Jelly Roll Morton
 "Shreveport to New Orleans" by Roger Creager
 "(Si Si) Je Suis Un Rock Star" by Bill Wyman
 "Smokey Bourbon Street" by Bill Black's Combo
 "Snooky & Andy At The Mardi Gras" by Snooky Pryor
 "Something Like That" by Tim McGraw 1999
 "Song of New Orleans" instrumental by Jerry Capehart with Eddie Cochran
 "Song of New Orleans" by Sunny Skylar
 "South In New Orleans" by Hungry Chuck
 "South Rampart Street Parade" (jazz standard)
 "Southern Sun" by Paul Oakenfold
 "Speed King" by Deep Purple
 "Spirit Of New Orleans" by Hans Olson 
 "Standing Outside a Broken Phone Booth With Money in My Hand" by Primitive Radio Gods
 "State Street Blues" by Cotton Pickers
 "Steppin' Out Under the Moon" by Big Rude Jake
 "Stoned In New Orleans" by Magic
 "Storyville" by Don Ellis
 "Storyville" by Paul Weston
 "Storyville" by Tony Carey
 "Storyville Blues" by Chris Barber
 "Storyville Story" by Gerry Mulligan
 "Stringbeans at Rock N' Bowl" by Rosie Ledet
 "Stripped Away" by Dr. John
 "Stuck in New Orleans" by Tommy McLain
 "Summertime in New Orleans" by Anders Osborne
 "Sun Down In New Orleans" by Jimmy McPartland
 "Sunny New Orleans" by Skip Prokop
 "Sunset On Louisianne" by Zachary Richard
 "Sweet Home New Orleans" by Dr. John
 "Sweet Talkin' Man" by Lynn Anderson
 "Swinging At The Haven" by Ellis Marsalis Jr. Quartet
 "Swinging Down In New Orleans" by Doc Cheatham

T
 "Take a Ride On A Riverboat" by Le Roux
 "Take Me Back Down To New Orleans" by Gator Beat
 "Take Me Back To New Orleans" by Chris Barber
 "Take me Back To New Orleans" by Gary U.S. Bonds, Cowboy Mouth
 "Take Me Down To New Orleans" by Ray Cyr and the Mardigras
 "Take Me To The Mardi Gras" by Paul Simon, Bob James
 "Talkin' Bout New Orleans" by The Meters
 "Tall Lean Girl From New Orleans" by Jody Levins
 "Tangled Up in Blue" by Bob Dylan
 "Tango Till They're Sore" by Tom Waits
 "Tchoupitoulas Congregation" by the Cherry Poppin' Daddies
 "Tchoupitoulas Road" by Joe Barry (singer)
 "Teasing You" by Earl King
 "Tell Your Sister" by Lloyd Cole
 "The Teens In Jeans From New Orleans" by Lillian Briggs
 "That's Enough of That Stuff" by Marcia Ball
 "There is a Light" by Clint Maedgen of The New Orleans Bingo! Show
 "They All Asked for You" written by Nocentelli, Neville, Porter, and Modeliste and performed by The Meters
 "Thibodeaux, Louisiana" by Marcia Ball
 "Third Street Blues" by Jimmy McPartland 
 "This City" by Steve Earle
 "This River Flows To New Orleans" by Tommy Reilly 
 "Tin Roof Blues" by the New Orleans Rhythm Kings
 "To New Orleans" by Harry Chalkitis
 "Toast Of New Orleans" by Ronnie Hughes
 "Toulouse Street" by The Doobie Brothers
 "A Town Called New Orleans" by Jimmy Dean
 "Treme Mardi Gras" by Kermit Ruffins
 "Treme Second Line (Blow da Whistle)" by Kermit Ruffins
 "Treme Song" by John Boutte
 "Trip To New Orleans" by The Bees
 "Trouble In New Orleans" by X. Lincoln
 "Tryin' To Get To Heaven" by Bob Dylan
 "Truckin'" by the Grateful Dead
 "Tugboats" by Dash Rip Rock

U
 "Up From New Orleans" by Yellowjackets

V
 "The Valleys of New Orleans" by The Veils
 "The Vampire Song" by Concrete Blonde
 "Viens Danser Le Hully-Gully (New Orleans)" by Sheila (singer)
 "Vieux Carre" by Paul Weston
 "Voodoo Charm" by Willy DeVille
 "Voodoo City" by Black 47

W
 "Washboard Lisa" by Grayson Capps 
 "Walk On" by John Hiatt
 "Walking Through New Orleans" by Pete Fountain
 "Walkin' Thru New Orleans" by Rusty Wier
 "Walking to New Orleans" by Fats Domino, Clifton Chenier
 "Way Down Yonder In New Orleans" by Freddy Cannon, Henry Creamer
 "Way Up Yonder In New Orleans" by Alex McMurray
 "We Gettin' There" by Dr. John
 "We Make Good Gumbo" by Tab Benoit
 "West End Blues" (jazz standard)
 "West Lawn Dirge" by Eureka Brass Band
 "What Am I Doin' In Kansas City (When You're In New Orleans)" by Guy Mitchell
 "What Is New Orleans" by Kermit Ruffins
 "Wheel Inside A Wheel" by Jimmy Buffett
 "When A St. Louis Woman Comes Down To New Orleans Blues" from Belle of the Nineties
 "When The Levee Breaks" by Galactic
 "When The Saints Go Marching In" recorded by numerous musicians, and by Louis Armstrong in 1938
 "When We Dance At The Mardi Gras" by Doc Evans And His Dixieland Band
 "Where The Blues Were Born In New Orleans" by Louis Armstrong
 "Where Were You" by Jackson Browne
 "While We Danced At The Mardi Gras" by Pete Fountain
 "Who Dat" by Ween
 "The Witch Queen of New Orleans" by Redbone

Y
 "Year Down In New Orleans" by Nanci Griffith
 "Yes I Love Her (New Orleans)"  by Ronni Kole
 "You Never Can Tell" by Chuck Berry
 "Your Boots In New Orleans" by Salon Music
 "You've Got to be Crazy to Live in This Town" by Alex McMurray

Z
 "Zydeco Mardis Gras" by Boozoo Chavis

References

New Orleans

Songs